UPS Airlines Flight 1354 was a scheduled cargo flight from Louisville, Kentucky, to Birmingham, Alabama. On August 14, 2013, the Airbus A300 flying the route crashed and burst into flames short of the runway on approach to Birmingham–Shuttlesworth International Airport. Both pilots were pronounced dead at the scene of the crash. They were the only people aboard the aircraft. It was the second fatal air crash for UPS Airlines.

Aircraft and crew
The aircraft involved in the accident was a 10-year-old Airbus A300F4-622R, registered as N155UP. It was built in 2003; UPS took delivery of it in February 2004. It was powered by Pratt & Whitney PW4000 engines. At the time of the accident, it had accumulated about 11,000 flight hours in 6,800 flight cycles (a flight cycle is one takeoff and landing).

The captain of Flight 1354 was 58-year old Cerea Beal, Jr. Prior to being hired by UPS, Beal was employed by TWA as a flight engineer and then first officer on the Boeing 727. He was hired by UPS in October 1990 as a 727 flight engineer and became a 727 first officer in August 1994. Twice, in 2000 and again in 2002, Beal began and then withdrew from training to upgrade to captain on the 727.  He transitioned to the A300 as a first officer in 2004 and then as a captain in 2009. At the time of the accident, he had accumulated 6,406 flight hours at UPS; 3,265 of which were on the A300.

The first officer was 37-year-old Shanda Fanning. Fanning was hired by UPS in 2006 as a 727 flight engineer. She became a first officer on the Boeing 757 in 2007, then transitioned to the Boeing 747 in 2009. She began flying the A300 in June 2012. At the time of the accident, she had accumulated 4,721 total flight hours, including 403 hours on the A300.

Accident

The aircraft was inbound on a nonscheduled flight at the time of the crash. Dark night visual flight rules prevailed at the airport, but variable instrument meteorological conditions with a variable ceiling were present north of the airport on the approach course.

The aircraft crashed around 04:47 local time (CDT, 09:47 UTC) while making a localizer nonprecision approach to runway 18 at Birmingham–Shuttlesworth International Airport. It clipped trees and struck ground three times uphill. Both crew members died in the accident.

Investigation

The National Transportation Safety Board (NTSB) launched an investigation and sent a 26-member go team to the crash site to collect perishable evidence. The cockpit voice recorder (CVR) and flight data recorder (FDR) were recovered on the following day and sent for analysis.

At their third media briefing on August 16, 2013, the NTSB reported that the crew had briefed the approach to runway 18 and were cleared to land by air traffic control two minutes prior to the end of the recording. At 16 seconds before the end of the recording, the aircraft's ground proximity warning system (GPWS) sounded two "sink rate" alerts, meaning that the aircraft was descending too rapidly. Three seconds later, Captain Beal reported having the runway in sight, which was confirmed by First Officer Fanning. The CVR recorded the sound of the first impact with trees 3 seconds after the pilots reported seeing the runway. A final "too low terrain" alert by the GPWS was then recorded, followed by the final sounds of impact.

To represent the country of manufacture, the French aviation accident investigation agency Bureau of Enquiry and Analysis for Civil Aviation Safety (BEA), assisted by Airbus technical advisors, participated in the investigation. Members of the FBI Evidence Response Team also assisted the NTSB. The NTSB stated in late August that no mechanical anomalies had yet been uncovered, but that the complete investigation would take several months.

On February 20, 2014, the NTSB held a public hearing in connection with its investigation. Excerpts from the CVR were presented, in which both the captain and first officer discussed their lack of sufficient sleep prior to the flight.

On September 9, 2014, the NTSB announced that the probable cause of the accident was that the aircrew had made an unstabilized approach into Birmingham–Shuttlesworth International Airport during which they failed to adequately monitor their altitude. The aircraft descended below the minimum descent altitude when the runway was not yet in sight, resulting in controlled flight into terrain about  short of the runway threshold. The NTSB also found that contributing factors in the accident were:

the flight crew's failure to properly configure and verify the flight management computer for the profile approach
the captain's failure to communicate his intentions to the first officer once it became apparent the vertical profile was not captured
the first officer's failure to make the required minimums callouts
the captain's performance deficiencies, likely due to factors including, but not limited to, fatigue, distraction, or confusion, consistent with performance deficiencies exhibited during training
the first officer's fatigue due to acute sleep loss resulting from her ineffective off-duty time management

Aftermath 

In 2014, the Independent Pilots Association filed suit against the FAA to end the cargo airplane exemption from the flight crew minimum rest requirements. In 2016, the lawsuit was dismissed by a Washington, DC, court, which determined the FAA had acted reasonably by excluding cargo airlines from the rest requirement based on a cost vs benefits analysis.

Bret Fanning, husband of First Officer Shanda Fanning, filed a lawsuit against Honeywell Aerospace in 2014, alleging that its GPWS installed on the A300 failed to alert the pilots that their aircraft was dangerously close to the ground.

In popular culture 
UPS Airlines Flight 1354 was also covered in the 10th episode of season 21 on Mayday titled "Deadly Delivery".

See also
Pakistan International Airlines Flight 268
Thai Airways International Flight 311
Flying Tiger Line Flight 66
1996 Croatia USAF CT-43 crash
Korean Air Flight 801
Trans-Colorado Airlines Flight 2286
Asiana Airlines Flight 214

References

External links

National Transportation Safety Board

UPS Airlines
"Statement on UPS Flight 1354." (Archive)
"Update on UPS Flight 1354" (Archive)
"Flight UP1354 on August 14, 2013 A300-600, registered N155UP." Bureau of Enquiry and Analysis for Civil Aviation Safety (Archive)
"UPS Flight 1354 accident in Birmingham – Alabama USA." Airbus (Archive)
Flight 1354's flight path on FlightAware 

Cockpit Voice Recorder transcript and accident summary

Airliner accidents and incidents involving controlled flight into terrain
Aviation accidents and incidents in 2013
Airliner accidents and incidents in Alabama
Accidents and incidents involving the Airbus A300
2013 in Alabama
Aviation accidents and incidents in the United States in 2013
1354
August 2013 events in the United States
Accidents and incidents involving cargo aircraft
Airliner accidents and incidents caused by pilot error
Birmingham–Shuttlesworth International Airport